Iranian Studies is a bimonthly peer-reviewed academic journal covering Iranian and Persianate history, literature, and society published by Routledge on behalf of the Association for Iranian Studies (formerly known as the International Society for Iranian Studies). It is published 6 times a year and was established in 1967. The editor-in-chief is Sussan Siavoshi. The journal is abstracted and indexed in the MLA International Bibliography.

References

External links
 
 Association for Iranian Studies (International Society for Iranian Studies)
 Iranian Studies Journal

Iranian studies journals
Historiography of Iran
Publications established in 1967
Taylor & Francis academic journals
Academic journals associated with learned and professional societies
Cambridge University Press academic journals